Don't Stop Movin' is the deubt album by the Italian electronic music group Livin' Joy. It featured the song "Dreamer", which peaked at No.1 on the UK Singles & US Dance charts, both in 1995, with Tameko Star on vocals of the album version, and a hidden bonus track with Janice Robinson's vocals on.

After Janice had left the group, the band continued on and released "Don't Stop Movin'", a few months later, by which time, Tameko Star had been chosen to be the group's new lead vocalist. "Don't Stop Movin'" peaked at No. 5 on the UK Singles Chart in Spring 1996. This was followed by another Top 10 single in the UK, ("Follow the Rules"). Two top 20 hits appeared in 1997, "Where Can I Find Love" and "Deep in You". The parent album, also called Don't Stop Movin''', grouped together the hits, including "Dreamer" with new vocals by Star.

There had been plans for a widespread commercial release of a single called "Just for the Sex of It" in Spring 1999; however these plans never happened. It only received a limited club run, but was released as a single in Australia and the UK.

Critical reception
AllMusic editor Jason Ankeny noted that the album has "a sound which owes an equal debt to Euro-dance music and underground house." A reviewer from Music Week'' wrote, "The Italian trio unleash a mixture of powerful party anthems and more subtle dancefloor delights. Uplifting stuff."

Track listing
 "Don't Stop Movin'"
 "Follow the Rules"
 "Deep in You"
 "Dreamer" (Tameko Star vocal)
 "Pick up the Phone"
 "Be Original"
 "Where Can I Find Love"
 "Don't Cha Wanna"
 "Whenever You're Lonely"
 "Let Me Love You"
 "Don't Stop Movin' (A. Manetta Mix)
 "Dreamer" (Janice Robinson vocal - Hidden bonus track)

Charts

References

1996 debut albums
Livin' Joy albums